Keston Desmond Dornick (born 26 May 1988) is a Guyanese-born Sint Maartener cricketer.

A right-handed batsman and right-arm medium-fast bowler, Dornick played at under-19 level for the Leeward Islands in 2006. He was later selected in Sint Maarten's squad for the 2008 Stanford 20/20. Having received a bye into the first round after Cuba could not fulfill their preliminary round fixture, Dornick made his Twenty20 debut in the first-round match against Saint Vincent and the Grenadines, which despite an unbeaten century from John Eugene, Sint Maarten lost by 10 runs and were eliminated from the tournament. This marks Dornick's only appearance in Twenty20 cricket.

See also
List of Sint Maarten Twenty20 players

References

External links
Keston Dornick at ESPNcricinfo
Keston Dornick at CricketArchive

Living people
1988 births
Guyanese emigrants to Sint Maarten
Sint Maarten cricketers
Sint Maarten representative cricketers